Charley Cobb (born 1929 or 1930) is a former American football coach.  He served as the head football at West Virginia University Institute of Technology in Montgomery, West Virginia for 16 seasons, from 1960 until 1975, compiling a record of 44–83–9.

References

Year of birth missing (living people)
Possibly living people
West Virginia Tech Golden Bears football coaches